Saran is a commune in the Loiret department in north-central France.

Saran has, considering its size, many sports facilities including two stadiums, indoor and outdoor tennis courts, one swimming pool and four gymnasiums.

Population

See also
 Communes of the Loiret department

References

Communes of Loiret